Jamishan-e Olya (also Romanized as Jāmīshān-e ‘Olyā) is a village in Sarab Rural District, in the Central District of Sonqor County, Kermanshah Province, Iran. At the 2006 census, its population was 267, in 56 families.

References 

Populated places in Sonqor County